Mañana es Para Siempre (English title: Tomorrow is Forever) is a Mexican telenovela produced by Nicandro Díaz González for Televisa in 2008. It is an adaption of the 2007 Colombian telenovela Pura sangre. It aired on Canal de las Estrellas from October 20, 2008 to June 12, 2009.

Lucero, Fernando Colunga, Sergio Sendel and Silvia Navarro star in the lead roles.

Univision aired Mañana es para siempre weeknights at 9pm/8c from February 23, 2009 to October 5, 2009. The finale on Univision was watched by over 11 million viewers, faring well against US mainstream shows.

Cast

Main
 Lucero as Bárbara Greco de Elizalde "The Hyena" / Rebeca Sánchez Frutos
 Fernando Colunga as Eduardo Juárez Cruz / Franco Santoro
 Omar Yubeili as Child Eduardo Juárez Cruz
 Sergio Sendel as Damián Gallardo Roa
 Silvia Navarro as Fernanda Elizalde Rivera
 Violeta Puga as Child Fernanda Elizalde Rivera
 Rogelio Guerra as Gonzalo Elizalde Linares / Artemio Bravo

Also main
 
 Guillermo Capetillo as Aníbal Elizalde Rivera / Jerónimo Elizalde
 Alberich as Young Anibal Elizalde Rivera
 Mario Iván Martínez as Steve Norton
 Dominika Paleta as Liliana Elizalde Rivera
 Nancy Patiño as Young Liliana Elizalde Rivera
 Roberto Palazuelos as Camilo Elizalde Rivera
 Angel Mar as Child Camilo Elizalde Rivera
 Carlos de la Mota as Santiago Elizalde Rivera
 Alejandro Ruiz as Jacinto Cordero
 Brayam Alejandro as Child Jacinto Cordero
 Jaime Garza as Silvestre Tinoco
 Luis Gimeno as Padre Bosco
 Ariadne Díaz as Aurora Artemiza Bravo Sánchez de Elizalde
 Arleth Terán as Priscila Alvear de Elizalde
 Marisol del Olmo as Erika Astorga
 Dacia Arcaráz as Margarita Campillo de Cordero
 Aleida Núñez as Gardenia Campillo
 Claudia Ortega as Flor Campillo
 Luis Bayardo as Ciro Palafox
 Fabián Robles as Vladimir Piñeiro
 Mariana Rios as Martina Tinoco
 Tania Vázquez as Venus García / Lovely Norton
 Benjamin Rivero as Lucio Bermejo
 Ricardo Silva as Dr. Plutarco Obregón
 Adalberto Parra as René Manzanares
 Humberto Elizondo as Agustín Astorga
 Ofelia Cano as Dolores "Dolly" de Astorga
 Hilda Aguirre as Graciela Vda. de Palafox
 Rafael del Villar as Simón Palafox
 Jaime Lozano as Jairo Roca 
 Janet Ruiz as Adolfina
 Jacqueline Arroyo as Tomasa

Special participation
 
 María Rojo as Soledad Cruz de Juarez
 Archie Lafranco as Rolando Alvear
 Esteban Franco as Osvaldo
 Erika Buenfil as Monserrat Rivera de Elizalde
 Gustavo Rojo as El Obispo
 Yolanda Cianni as Úrsula Roa de Gallardo
 María Prado as Dominga Ojeda
 Pedro Weber "Chatanuga" as Tobías
 Juan Carlos Casasola as Graciano
 Salvador Ibarra as Dr. Carlos Rey
 Elizabeth Aguilar as La Madame
 Juan Antonio Edwards as Grajales
 Adanely Nuñez as Ana Gregoria Bravo
 Cecilia Gabriela as Altagracia Linares de Elizalde
 Ignacio López Tarso as Isaac Newton Barrera
 Andrea Legarreta as Reporter
 Ana Martín as Woman in wedding

DVD releases
A DVD version was released in Mexico and the U.S in May 2010. This box set contains 4 discs with a total of run time of 815 minutes.

Awards and nominations

References

External links

 at esmas.com 

2008 telenovelas
Mexican telenovelas
2008 Mexican television series debuts
2009 Mexican television series endings
Television shows set in Mexico City
Televisa telenovelas
Mexican television series based on Colombian television series
Spanish-language telenovelas